Heinrich XIII may refer to:

 Heinrich XIII, Prince Reuss of Greiz, born 1747
 Heinrich XIII Prinz Reuss, born 1951